Szerencs is a district in central-eastern part of Borsod-Abaúj-Zemplén County. Szerencs is also the name of the town where the district seat is found. The district is located in the Northern Hungary Statistical Region.

Geography 
Szerencs District borders with Szikszó District and Gönc District to the north, Tokaj District to the east, Tiszavasvári District (Szabolcs-Szatmár-Bereg County) and Tiszaújváros District to the south, Miskolc District to the west. The number of the inhabited places in Szerencs District is 16.

Municipalities 
The district has 1 town, 2 large villages and 13 villages.
(ordered by population, as of 1 January 2012)

The bolded municipality is city, italics municipalities are large villages.

Demographics

In 2011, it had a population of 38,106 and the population density was 88/km².

Ethnicity
Besides the Hungarian majority, the main minorities are the Roma (approx. 4,000) and German (850).

Total population (2011 census): 38,106
Ethnic groups (2011 census): Identified themselves: 38,709 persons:
Hungarians: 33,893 (87.56%)
Gypsies: 3,777 (9.76%)
Germans: 827 (2.14%)
Others and indefinable: 212 (0.55%)
Approx. 500 persons in Szerencs District did declare more than one ethnic group at the 2011 census.

Religion
Religious adherence in the county according to 2011 census:

Catholic – 18,124 (Roman Catholic – 16,714; Greek Catholic – 1,410); 
Reformed – 9,433;
Evangelical – 51;
other religions – 403; 
Non-religious – 2,083; 
Atheism – 121;
Undeclared – 7,891.

Gallery

See also
List of cities and towns of Hungary
Szerencs Subregion (until 2013)

References

External links
 Postal codes of the Szerencs District

Districts in Borsod-Abaúj-Zemplén County